Cao Jian (died December 225 or January 226) was a prince in the state of Cao Wei in the Three Kingdoms period of China. He was a son of Cao Pi, the first emperor of Wei. His mother, whose maiden family name was Zhu (朱), was a concubine of Cao Pi holding the rank of shuyuan (淑媛; translated "Decent Concubine"). He was enfeoffed as the Prince of Dongwuyang (東武陽王) in August or September 225, but died some months later in December 225 or January 226. In 235, he was given the posthumous title "Prince Huai" (懷王). His princedom was abolished because he had no son to inherit it.

See also
 Cao Wei family trees#Ladies Pan, Zhu, and Qiu
 Lists of people of the Three Kingdoms

Notes

References

 Chen, Shou (3rd century). Records of the Three Kingdoms (Sanguozhi).

Year of birth unknown
225 deaths
Cao Wei imperial princes